Charles Newell Fowler Sr. (November 2, 1852, Lena, Illinois – May 27, 1932, Orange, New Jersey) was an American lawyer and Republican Party politician who represented New Jersey in the United States House of Representatives from 1895 to 1911.

Fowler's district centered on his native Union County, New Jersey. From 1895 to 1903,  also included Bayonne and most of Essex County. From 1903 to 1911,  was redrawn to instead include Morris and Warren counties.

He retired from the House in 1910 to seek election to the U.S. Senate but narrowly lost the Republican nomination to Governor Edward C. Stokes in the state's first direct primary election. He lost a second match with Stokes by a much wider margin in the 1913 gubernatorial primary.

Early life and career
Fowler was born in Lena, Illinois on November 2, 1852. He attended the public schools in Lena and Beloit College. He graduated from Yale College in 1876 where he was a member of Skull and Bones.  He then attended the University of Chicago Law School and graduated in 1878.

He was admitted to the bar in 1878 and commenced the practice of law in Beloit, Kansas. Fowler moved to Cranford, New Jersey in 1883 and to Elizabeth, New Jersey in 1891 and engaged in banking, serving as president of a mortgage company.

Fowler was a member of the Republican State Committee from 1898 to 1907.

Congress
Fowler was elected as a Republican to the Fifty-fourth and to the seven succeeding Congresses, serving in office from March 4, 1895, to March 3, 1911. He was chairman of the Committee on Banking and Currency (Fifty-seventh through Sixtieth Congresses). He was an unsuccessful candidate for nomination for election to the United States Senate in 1910.

Later life
After leaving Congress, he resumed banking activities at Elizabeth. He also engaged in literary pursuits and operated a group of marble quarries in Vermont. In 1930, he moved to Orange, New Jersey, where he died on May 27, 1932. He was interred in Fairview Cemetery in Westfield, New Jersey.

His home in Elizabeth is listed on the National Register of Historic Places.

References

External links

Charles Newell Fowler at The Political Graveyard

Address of Hon. Charles N. Fowler of New Jersey in the House of Representatives, Wednesday, March 31, 1897
An American Banking System By Charles Newell Fowler (1916)
Seventeen Talks on the Banking Question By Charles Newell Fowler (1913)
The Fowler Financial and Currency Bill Speech in the US House of Representatives by Charles Newell Fowler (1902)
The National Issues of 1916 by Charles Newell Fowler (1916)
The United States Reserve Bank: The Fundamental Defects of the Federal Reserve System Exposed and the Necessary Remedy By Charles Newell Fowler (1922)

1852 births
1932 deaths
People from Cranford, New Jersey
People from Stephenson County, Illinois
People from Orange, New Jersey
Politicians from Elizabeth, New Jersey
University of Chicago Law School alumni
Republican Party members of the United States House of Representatives from New Jersey
Beloit College alumni
Yale College alumni